Passionate Youth is a 1925 American silent drama film directed by Dallas M. Fitzgerald and starring Beverly Bayne, Frank Mayo, and Pauline Garon.

Plot
As described in a film magazine reviews, Mary and John Rand have graduated from law school and, upon their marriage, John joins the ministry despite the objections of his wife. Their daughter, Henrietta, is neglected and enters a free life of jazz, drinking, and joy rides. Mary persuades John to permit her to get a divorce, so that she may practice law. After he has consented she joins Bruce Corbin and enters a campaign to be elected district attorney. With the help of Attorney Corbin, she is elected and falls in love with him. Corbin proves untrue and falls in love with Henrietta. Mary then demands that Corbin marry Henrietta with the threat that she will expose him in a crooked deal if he does not. Corbin is found dead. Henrietta is accused of murder and put on trial. John’s divorce is discovered by his congregation and is asked to leave the pulpit. Pleading that he be allowed to aid in the defense of his daughter, he obtains the testimony of Peggy, a gold digger, who saw Jimmy Wellington shoot Bruce Corbin in a fit of jealousy. Wellington had later gone to his death in an automobile accident. Mary realizes that her neglect of her daughter has led to the trouble and she returns to her husband. They are remarried.

Cast

References

Bibliography
 Munden, Kenneth White. The American Film Institute Catalog of Motion Pictures Produced in the United States, Part 1. University of California Press, 1997.

External links
 

1925 films
1925 drama films
1920s English-language films
American silent feature films
Silent American drama films
Films directed by Dallas M. Fitzgerald
American black-and-white films
1920s American films
English-language drama films